Piotrowice Małe may refer to the following places in Poland:
Piotrowice Małe, Lower Silesian Voivodeship (south-west Poland)
Piotrowice Małe, Warmian-Masurian Voivodeship (north Poland)